Windsor is a hamlet in Cornwall, England, United Kingdom. It is located half-a-mile east of Lansallos village.

References

Hamlets in Cornwall
Polperro